Shane Huke (born 2 October 1985) is a retired professional footballer who last played for Maidstone United.

Club career
He began his career with Peterborough United, and scored his first competitive goal in his career on 25 November 2006, against Torquay United, a match which Peterborough won 5–2. He moved to Dagenham & Redbridge in May 2007.

Huke was regularly strongly linked with several A-League clubs in Australia. On 23 January 2009, Huke was released by Dagenham & Redbridge for personal reasons. Dagenham manager, John Still said he was very sad and disappointed to be losing Huke.

On 25 March 2010, Huke signed for Rushden & Diamonds until the end of the 2009–10 season.

On 17 May 2011, Huke left Rushden & Diamonds to join Conference South side Dover Athletic on a one-year deal. In May 2012 he signed a new contract with the Kent club.

Huke signed for newly relegated Conference South club Ebbsfleet United in June 2013. He eventually left the club in January 2015, to join Maidstone United

In the summer of 2015, Huke was forced to retire because of a knee injury. He now works as a matchday ambassador for Ebbsfleet United.

Honours

Club
Maidstone United
 Isthmian League Premier Division: 2014–15

References

External links
 Central Coast Mariners profile
 OzFootball profile

1985 births
Living people
Sportspeople from Reading, Berkshire
Association football defenders
English footballers
Peterborough United F.C. players
King's Lynn F.C. players
Bedford Town F.C. players
Heybridge Swifts F.C. players
Cambridge City F.C. players
Hornchurch F.C. players
Dagenham & Redbridge F.C. players
Central Coast Mariners FC players
Rushden & Diamonds F.C. players
Dover Athletic F.C. players
Ebbsfleet United F.C. players
Maidstone United F.C. players
English Football League players
National League (English football) players
A-League Men players
Footballers from Berkshire